Dear Listener is the debut album of English MC Lowkey. The album was released after 3 mixtapes by Lowkey. In support of the album, music videos for "Alphabet Assassin", "Revolution", "Relatives" and "In My Lifetime" which features Wretch 32 were made. The album was released on 20 October 2008 through independent label SO Empire Recordings. The album didn't manage to chart.

Track listing

Music videos
Alphabet Assassin
Revolution
Relatives
In My Lifetime

References

2008 albums
Lowkey albums